Wang Guofeng (born 1 March 1963) is a Chinese weightlifter. He competed in the men's featherweight event at the 1984 Summer Olympics.

References

External links
 

1963 births
Living people
Chinese male weightlifters
Olympic weightlifters of China
Weightlifters at the 1984 Summer Olympics
Place of birth missing (living people)
20th-century Chinese people